Nafoxadol (INN) is an analgesic drug which was never marketed.

References 

Analgesics
2-Naphthyl compounds
Abandoned drugs